Place des Vosges, originally Place Royale, is the oldest planned square in Paris, France. It is located in the Marais district, and it straddles the dividing-line between the 3rd and 4th arrondissements of Paris. It was a fashionable and expensive square to live in during the 17th and 18th centuries, and one of the main reasons for the chic nature of Le Marais among the Parisian nobility.

History 
Originally known as Place Royale, Place des Vosges was built by Henri IV from 1605 to 1612. A true square (140 m × 140 m), it embodied one of the first European programs of royal city planning (Plaza Mayor in Madrid, begun in 1590, precedes it). It was built on the site of the Hôtel des Tournelles and its gardens: at a tournament at the Tournelles, a royal residence, Henri II was wounded and died. Catherine de' Medici had the Gothic complex demolished, and she moved to the Louvre Palace.

Place Royale, inaugurated in 1612 with a grand carrousel to celebrate the engagement of Louis XIII and Anne of Austria, is a prototype of the residential squares of European cities that were to come. What was new about Place Royale in 1612 was that the housefronts were all built to the same design, probably by Jean Baptiste Androuet du Cerceau, of red brick with strips of stone quoins over vaulted arcades that stand on square pillars. The steeply-pitched blue slate roofs are pierced with discreet small-paned dormers above the pedimented dormers that stand upon the cornices. Only the north range was built with the vaulted ceilings that the “galleries” were meant to have. Two pavilions that rise higher than the unified roofline of the square centre the north and south faces and offer access to the square through triple arches. Though they are designated the Pavilion of the King and of the Queen, no royal has ever lived in the aristocratic square, except for Anne of Austria in the Pavilion de la Reine, for a short while. Place Royale initiated subsequent developments of Paris that created a suitable urban background for the French aristocracy and nobility.

The square was often the place for the nobility to chat, and served as a meeting place for them. This was so until the Revolution.

Before the square was completed, Henri IV ordered Place Dauphine to be laid out. Within a mere five-year period, the king oversaw an unmatched building scheme for the ravaged medieval city: additions to the Louvre Palace, the Pont Neuf, and the Hôpital Saint Louis as well as the two royal squares.

Cardinal Richelieu had an equestrian bronze of Louis XIII erected in the centre (there were no garden plots until 1680). In the late 18th century, while most of the nobility moved to the Faubourg Saint-Germain district, the square managed to keep some of its aristocratic owners until the Revolution. It was renamed Place des Vosges in 1799 when the département of Vosges became the first to pay taxes supporting a campaign of the Revolutionary army. The Restoration returned the old royal name, but the short-lived Second Republic restored the revolutionary one in 1870.

Today the square is planted with a bosquet of mature lindens set in grass and gravel, surrounded by clipped lindens.

Residents of place des Vosges
 No. 1bis Madame de Sevigné was born here
 No. 6, “Maison de Victor Hugo”, the writer's home from 1832 to 1848, in what was then the Hôtel de Rohan (the Princes of Guéménée line), now a museum devoted to his memory, managed by the City of Paris
 No. 7 Sully, Henri IV's great minister
 No. 8 poet Théophile Gautier and writer Alphonse Daudet
 No. 9 (Hôtel de Chaulnes), seat of l’Académie d’Architecture, currently also tenanted by Galerie Historisimus
 No. 11 occupied from 1639 to 1648 by the courtesan Marion Delorme
No. 12 occupied by Émilie du Châtelet
 No. 14 (Hôtel de la Rivière). Its ceilings painted by Lebrun are reinstalled in the Musée Carnavalet. Rabbi David Feuerwerker, Antoinette Feuerwerker and Atara Marmor
 No. 15 Marguerite Louise d’Orléans, wife of Cosimo III de' Medici Grand Duke of Tuscany.
 No. 17 former residence of Bossuet
 No. 20 Prince Obolensky Arnaud Henry Salas-Perez
 No. 21 Cardinal Richelieu from 1615 to 1627
 No. 23 post-impressionist painter Georges Dufrénoy
 No. 28 (Pavillon de la Reine) Family of Chabot-Rohan

See also 
 Marywil

Notes

References 
 Hilary Ballon, The Paris of Henry IV: Architecture and Urbanism, 1994 
DeJean, Joan. "'Light of the city of light' The Place des Vosges"in her How Paris Became Paris: The Invention of the Modern City  NY:Bloomsbury,  2014. . chapter 2, pp. 45–61.

External links 

 The official guide, partner of the Paris Tourist Office
 
 Satellite image from Google Maps
  Place des Vosges audio tour
 dans le parc

Urban public parks
Vosges, Place des
Le Marais
Buildings and structures in the 3rd arrondissement of Paris
Buildings and structures in the 4th arrondissement of Paris
Buildings and structures completed in 1612
1612 establishments in France
Garden squares